(born 12 May 1958, in Tokyo), is a former Japanese rugby union player who played as prop. Currently he works at the Non-profit organization MIP Sports Project.

Career
After graduating from Meiji University, Aizawa joined Ricoh, where he played in the All-Japan Rugby Company Championship. He was first capped for the Japan national team in the match against Korea, in Fukuoka, on 27 October 1984. Aizawa was also in the 1987 Rugby World Cup roster, where he played only against Australia at Sydney, on 3 June 1987. His last cap was in the match against Korea, in Hong Kong, on 19 November 1989, earning international caps for Japan.

Notes

External links
Masaharu Aizawa international stats

1958 births
Living people
Sportspeople from Tokyo
Rugby union props
Japanese rugby union players
Black Rams Tokyo players
Japan international rugby union players